Mamuka Kobakhidze (born 23 August 1992) is a Georgian professional football player. He plays for FC Dinamo Batumi.

Club career
He made his debut in the Russian Premier League on 22 November 2014 for FC Rubin Kazan in a game against FC Ural Sverdlovsk Oblast.

On 4 August 2017, he returned to Georgia, signing with FC Locomotive Tbilisi.

International career
He made his national team debut on 11 October 2020 in a Nations League game against Armenia.

References

External links
 
 

1995 births
Living people
Footballers from Tbilisi
Footballers from Georgia (country)
Association football defenders
Georgia (country) youth international footballers
Georgia (country) under-21 international footballers
Georgia (country) international footballers
FC Zestafoni players
FC Dila Gori players
FC Rubin Kazan players
FC Mordovia Saransk players
FC Metalurgi Rustavi players
FC Spartak Vladikavkaz players
FC Lokomotivi Tbilisi players
FC Torpedo Kutaisi players
FC Dinamo Batumi players
Erovnuli Liga players
Russian Premier League players
Expatriate footballers from Georgia (country)
Expatriate footballers in Russia
FC Neftekhimik Nizhnekamsk players